Klaas Sys (born 30 November 1986) is a Belgian former professional cyclist.

Major results
2007
 2nd Overall Volta a Lleida
1st Stage 5a (TTT)
2009
 1st Stage 3 Circuit des Ardennes
 3rd Romsée–Stavelot–Romsée
2010
 2nd Memorial Gilbert Letêcheur
 3rd Omloop Het Nieuwsblad Beloften
2011
 1st Tour Nivernais Morvan
 2nd Overall Tour de Guadeloupe
1st Stages 1 & 4 
 2nd Romsée–Stavelot–Romsée
 2nd Tour du Pays du Roumois

References

External links

1986 births
Living people
Belgian male cyclists
Place of birth missing (living people)